( ) is a joint venture between Toshiba and Mitsubishi Electric headquartered in Tokyo, Japan, specializing in industrial electric and automation systems for industrial plants. The company develops and produces power electronics apparatus, electric motors, drives, and uninterruptible power supplies. TMEIC has worldwide operations with approximately 2000 employees.

Divisions 
Industrial Systems
Industrial Automation and Drive Systems
Power Electronics Systems
Rotating Machinery Systems

History 
Tokyo Electric Company, the predecessor of Toshiba Corporation, was founded in 1896.

Mitsubishi Electric Corporation was founded in 1921.

In 1999, Toshiba and Mitsubishi Electric established TMA Electric Corporation (TMAE), a joint venture specializing in rotating machinery.
In 2000, Toshiba and General Electric Company formed Toshiba GE Automation Systems (TGAJ) operating in sales and engineering of industrial plant systems.

Toshiba and Mitsubishi Electric have decided to unify TMAE, TGAJ and their industrial systems division to form a joint venture named Toshiba Mitsubishi-Electric Industrial Systems Corporation (TMEIC).
TMEIC started business on October 1, 2003.

Products 
Processing Board
Control Board
Uninterruptible power supply
Power Converter Devices
Drive Equipment
Large Capacity Motors and Generators
Motor for Metal Rolling Mill
Wind Power Generator
Ozone Gas Generating System
Ozone Water Producing System
Steel plant automation
Photovoltaic Inverters

Locations

Japan
Head Office (Tokyo)
Fuchu Works (Fuchu)
Keihin Works (Yokohama)
Kobe Works (Kobe)
Nagasaki Works (Nagasaki)

Overseas Affiliated Companies
TMEIC Corporation (Roanoke, VA, United States; Branch: Houston)
TMEIC Power Electronics Products Corporation ( Houston, USA)
TMEIC Sistemas Industriais da America do Sul Ltda (São Paulo, Brazil)
TMEIC Europe Limited. (Middlesex, United Kingdom. Branch: Bari, Italy)
TMEIC International Corporation (Istanbul, Turkey)
Toshiba Mitsubishi-Electric Industrial Systems (China) Corporation (Beijing, China. Branch: Shanghai)
Shanghai Bao-ling Electric Control Equipment Co., Ltd. (Shanghai, China)
Guangzhou Toshiba Baiyun Ryoki Power Electronics Co., Ltd. (Guangzhou, China)
TMEIC Asia Company Limited (Hong Kong. Branches: Singapore; Taiwan)
TMEIC Industrial Systems India Private Limited (Hyderabad, Telangana India. Branch: Mumbai, Pune, Gurgaon, Bangalore)
TMEIC Power Electronics Systems India Private Limited, (Bangalore, India)
TMEIC Process Technology Application Center, Ltd (Melbourne, Australia)

References

External links 
 http://www.tmeic.com

Engineering companies based in Tokyo
Companies established in 2003
Mitsubishi Electric
Toshiba